John Head is an English musician from Kensington, Liverpool. He is the younger brother of Mick Head and has performed with Shack and the Pale Fountains as lead guitarist. He has also performed with Arthur Lee from Love with his brother Mick and other past Shack members.

John Head compositions appeared on Shack albums such as On the Corner of Miles and Gil and Here's Tom with the Weather.

External links
Video interview with John Head and John Head acoustic session from BBC Liverpool08

English rock guitarists
English male guitarists
English new wave musicians
Living people
Musicians from Liverpool
Year of birth missing (living people)
Shack (band) members